Canting arms are heraldic bearings that represent the bearer's name (or, less often, some attribute or function) in a visual pun or rebus. 

French heralds used the term , as they would sound out the name of the armiger. Many armorial allusions require research for elucidation because of changes in language and dialect that have occurred over the past millennium.

Canting arms – some in the form of rebuses – are quite common in German civic heraldry. They have also been increasingly used in the 20th century among the British royal family. When the visual representation is expressed through a rebus, this is sometimes called a rebus coat of arms.
An in-joke among the Society for Creative Anachronism heralds is the pun, "Heralds don't pun; they cant."

Examples of canting arms

Personal coats of arms 
A famous example of canting arms are those of Queen Elizabeth The Queen Mother's paternal family, the Bowes-Lyon family. The arms (pictured below) contain the bows and blue lions that make up the arms of the Bowes and Lyon families.

Municipal coats of arms 
Municipal coats of arms which interpret the town's name in rebus form are also called canting. Here are a few examples.

Ecclesiastical coats of arms

See also
 Japanese rebus monogram

Notes

Sources
 Winifred Hall: Canting and Allusive Arms of England and Wales.  1966.

References

External links

Canting arms (Britannica)
Canting arms – 100 armes parlantes (YouTube)

Heraldry